Hypsopygia nigrapuncta is a species of snout moth in the genus Hypsopygia. It was described by William James Kaye in 1901. It is found in Trinidad.

References

Moths described in 1901
Pyralini